Škale is a settlement in the Municipality of Velenje in northern Slovenia. It lies just north of the town of Velenje. The area is part of the traditional region of Styria. The entire municipality is now included in the Savinja Statistical Region.

The local church is dedicated to Saint Joseph and belongs to the Parish of Velenje Saint Martin.

Notable people
 Josef Krainc, Austro-Hungarian lawyer, philosopher and politician of Slovene descent

References

External links

Škale at Geopedia

Populated places in the City Municipality of Velenje